The Portugal men's national under-20 basketball team is the national basketball team of Portugal for under-20s, administered by the Portuguese Basketball Federation. It represents the country in international men's under-20 basketball competitions.

FIBA U20 European Championship participations

See also
Portugal men's national basketball team
Portugal men's national under-19 basketball team
Portugal women's national under-20 basketball team

References

External links
Archived records of Portugal team participations

Basketball
Men's national under-20 basketball teams